Douglas McGowan, MC (November 18, 1915 – October 25, 1989) was a Canadian politician and businessman. He represented 3rd Kings in the Legislative Assembly of Prince Edward Island from 1959 to 1966 as a Progressive Conservative.

McGowan was born in 1915 in Kilmuir, Prince Edward Island. He married Elizabeth Margaret Watson in 1945. McGowan attended Mount Allison University, and was a businessman by career. He established McGowan Motors in Montague, Prince Edward Island. McGowan was also a municipal councillor, serving as deputy mayor of Montague from 1951 to 1955.

McGowan entered provincial politics in the 1959 election, when he defeated Liberal incumbent Keir Clark by 58 votes to become councillor for the electoral district of 3rd Kings. He was re-elected in the 1962 election. McGowan did not re-offer in the 1966 election.

McGowan died in Montague on October 25, 1989.

References

1915 births
1989 deaths
Businesspeople from Prince Edward Island
Mount Allison University alumni
People from Kings County, Prince Edward Island
Prince Edward Island municipal councillors
Progressive Conservative Party of Prince Edward Island MLAs
Canadian recipients of the Military Cross
Canadian Grenadier Guards officers
Canadian Army personnel of World War II